Marcia Maureen Richardson-Bailey (born 10 February 1972 in Slough) is a female retired English athlete who specialised in the sprinting events.

Athletics career
She represented Great Britain at two consecutive Summer Olympics, starting in 1996, as well as four World Championships. She represented England in the 100 and 200 metres and won a bronze medal in the 4 x 100 metres relay event, at the 1998 Commonwealth Games in Kuala Lumpur, Malaysia.

Competition record

Personal bests
Outdoor
100 metres – 11.35 (+2.0 m/s) (Bedford 2000)
200 metres – 23.72 (-0.9 m/s) (Sheffield 1997)
Indoor
60 metres – 7.24 (Birmingham 2000)
200 metres – 24.50 (Toronto 1993)

References

1972 births
Living people
English female sprinters
Athletes (track and field) at the 1998 Commonwealth Games
Athletes (track and field) at the 1996 Summer Olympics
Athletes (track and field) at the 2000 Summer Olympics
Olympic athletes of Great Britain
Sportspeople from Slough
Commonwealth Games medallists in athletics
Commonwealth Games bronze medallists for England
Competitors at the 1993 Summer Universiade
Competitors at the 1995 Summer Universiade
Olympic female sprinters
Medallists at the 1998 Commonwealth Games